Angel Fire Airport  is a county-owned public-use airport located  north of the central business district of Angel Fire, a town in Colfax County, New Mexico. It is included in the US National Plan of Integrated Airport Systems for 2011–2015, which falls under the US FAA category of "general aviation facility".

Facilities and aircraft 
For the 12-month period ending April 30, 2010, the airport had 30 aircraft operations, an average of 2 per month: 67% general aviation and 33% military.

References

External links 
 
 

Airports in New Mexico
Buildings and structures in Colfax County, New Mexico
Transportation in Colfax County, New Mexico